Carrara Indoor Stadium is a multi-purpose arena located at Carrara on Queensland's Gold Coast and can accommodate 1,600 fans, with additional seating provided if required which can push total capacity for events such as basketball up to 2,962. The stadium stands adjacent to the 25,000 seat Metricon Stadium and forms part of the Carrara Sports Complex. The stadium has the nickname The Greenhouse as even during winter it would get "Hot and steamy as Hades at times", although that changed with $800,000 worth of improvements in 1996 including new air conditioning.

The stadium was the home of former National Basketball League team the Gold Coast Rollers who played there from 1990 until 1996, after which their licence was revoked due to financial struggles. The stadium later became the training venue for the NBL's Gold Coast Blaze who played at the larger 5,269 seat Gold Coast Convention and Exhibition Centre until the team folded after the 2011–12 NBL season.

Carrara Indoor Stadium's flexible design means it is regularly used for sporting activities ranging from soccer and basketball through to figure skating. The stadium has also been used to hold expos as well special dinners and functions.

With the Gold Coast winning the right to host the 2018 Commonwealth Games, plans were put in place to develop a new indoor venue at Carrara under the name of Carrara Sport and Leisure Centre, which will replace the Carrara Indoor Stadium and is slated to host the badminton competition.

Squash Australia moved their headquarters to the Carrara Indoor Stadium in 2018.

See also

 Gold Coast Sports Precinct
 Sports on the Gold Coast, Queensland
 Venues of the 2018 Commonwealth Games

References

Gold Coast Rollers
Defunct National Basketball League (Australia) venues
Basketball venues in Australia
Sports venues on the Gold Coast, Queensland
Badminton venues
Weightlifting venues
2018 Commonwealth Games venues
Carrara, Queensland